Masury Estate Ballroom is a historic ballroom located at Center Moriches in Suffolk County, New York. It was built about 1898 and was originally part of the Masury family estate. It is a long, rambling one story, Shingle Style wood-frame building. It has a "T shaped plan which contains the ballroom in the main upper portion and a bowling alley and billiards room in the long base. The building sits on a brick foundation and features a broad hip roof with hip roof dormers. The estate house was dismantled following the New England Hurricane of 1938, but the ballroom remained in use and is now owned by the Holiday Beach Property Owners Association.

It was added to the National Register of Historic Places in 1986.

History
John W. Masury earned his fortune in paint innovation, particularly the lid on paint cans found in every home goods store. The metal paint can was also his invention. He bought a large tract of beachfront land in the late 18th century, intending to create an estate and family retreat. He died in 1895 before realizing his dream. His widow, Grace Harkins Masury, hired architect William Lambert of NYC to design a retreat that was both opulent and in the style of beachfront estates of the day. The colonial revival style mansion, with an assortment of buildings including a ballroom, servants quarters, stables, water tower, boat house and carriage barn became the family estate her husband dreamed of creating. The finished complex hosted many summer parties on the south shore, with the broad lawns and the ballroom being the centerpieces of a picturesque summer escape from the city environs. The building were wood-frame in the shingle style prevalent on waterfront estates at the turn of the century. The great hurricane of 1938 leveled the mansion, but the ballroom endured, hosting parties for servicemen during the years of WWII, it showcased the lifestyles of the rich with its intricately railed mezzanine, a wood paneled bowling alley and taproom, along with a billiards parlor. It also had a domed and painted ceiling to accentuate the space. Grand parties were the order of the day every summer for over 50 years, until the ballroom was sold by the Masury family in 1954. Walter Hewitt, the new owner, subdivided the property and built new houses on the land, and the ballroom was sold to the Holiday Beach homeowners association, the current owners of the ballroom.

The outside of the building belies the interior, the shingle style of beachfront homes hides an interior of elegant wainscoting, designed with ultimate detail to wood paneling and stained glass windows with elegant fireplaces and lavishly decorated staircases. The building recalls the sumptuous tastes of the opulent lifestyles enjoyed by the rich at the turn of the century on Long Island.

Landmark
The Masury Ball room is recognized for being one of the few remaining examples of the opulent environs enjoyed by the rich in turn of the century Center Moriches on the south shore of L.I. It is a recognized landmark and residential development which is architecturally outstanding and deserving of note, occupying a space in the town of Brookhaven's cultural history. It was added to the NRHP on Sept. 11, 1986.

References

External links

Holiday Beach Property Owners Association website

Center Moriches Historic District
Buildings and structures on the National Register of Historic Places in New York (state)
Shingle Style architecture in New York (state)
Music venues completed in 1898
Buildings and structures in Suffolk County, New York
Music venues in New York (state)
Ballrooms in the United States
National Register of Historic Places in Brookhaven (town), New York
Event venues on the National Register of Historic Places in New York (state)